Muhammad Ahmad Khalafallah (1916-1991) was an Egyptian Islamic modernist thinker and writer.

In 1947, Cairo University refused his doctoral dissertation presented to the Department of Arabic entitled The Narrative Art in the Holy Qur'an (al-Fann al-qasasi fi al-Qurʾan al-karim), as he suggested that holy texts are allegoric and that they should not be seen as something fixed, but as a moral direction. Indeed, the aim of Muhammad is to convince people. So he uses all rhetorical ways at his disposal, which includes metaphors, biblical and pre-islamic narratives. In Khalafallah's opinion, historical truth is not the main goal, but rather the religious and ethic sense conveyed by these stories. Khalafallah has been accused to treat the Speech of God as if it was a human product. Yet, he does not question the authenticity of the revelation. He takes up a traditional theme, that of the inimitability (iʿjaz) of the Qur'an - the first title of his thesis was Min asrar al-iʿjaz, (“On the Secrets of the Qurʾan’s inimitability"). He was fired from his teaching position and transferred to the Ministry of Culture. 

Afterwards, he started a thesis on a non-religious subject and received his doctorate in 1952. He ended his career at the Egyptian Ministry of Culture.

His doctoral thesis has finally been published in 1954. His master's thesis, al-Jadal fī l-Qurʾān (“Polemic in the Qurʾān”) has been published with the title Muhammad wa l-quwâ l-mudadda ("Muhammad and the opposition forces"), Cairo, 1973.

He wrote Mafāhīm Qurʼānīyah ( "Quranic concepts"), published in arabic in 1984, al-Qur'ân-wa mushkilat hayâti-nâ l-mu'âsira ("The Qur'an and our contemporary problems") and al-Qur'ân wa l-dawla ("The Qur'an and the State"). But these works are less innovative than his doctoral thesis.

Notes and references

External link 
al-Fann al-qasasi fi al-Qurʾan al-karim on archive.org (in arabic).

See also 
 Islamic Modernism
 Arab socialism

1920 births
1991 deaths
20th-century Muslim scholars of Islam
Egyptian Muslim scholars of Islam